Bangert is a surname. Notable people with the surname include:

Emilius Bangert (1883–1962), Danish composer, classical organist, and educator
Gretchen Bangert (born 1966), American politician
Jann Bangert (born 1997), German footballer
Ursel Bangert, German physicist
Victor Bangert (born 1950), German mathematician